It's a Long, Long Way to Tipperary is a 1914 Australian silent film based on the song It's a Long Way to Tipperary by Jack Judge.

Plot
Irish woman Molly Malone is in love with Paddy O'Reilly, who emigrates to England to better himself. He enlists in the British Army during World War I and is sent to the front. Another Irishman, Mick, desires Molly and swears vengeance on Paddy. Molly dreams that Paddy and Mick fight but then sees that she is reunited with Paddy.

Production
The film was one of several produced by the Higgins brothers in Sydney in the early years of the war. They struggled to recover their costs from the distributor, Australasian Films.

They were also involved in a dispute with the Fraser Film Release and Photographic Company over their attempts to distribute a British film from Maurice Elvey with the same title.

Raymond Longford said he worked on the film but claimed the direction was done by the Higgins brothers.

References

External links
 
A Long, Long Way to Tipperary at National Film and Sound Archive

Australian black-and-white films
1914 films
1914 drama films
Australian drama films
Australian silent films
Films based on songs
Silent drama films